Charlie Lake is a settlement in British Columbia. It is established on the southern shore of Charlie Lake, immediately north-west from Fort St. John, along the Alaska Highway. The population of the community is 1,897 as of 2016.

Designated places in British Columbia
Settlements in British Columbia